John T. Lamping is an American politician and securities broker from the state of Missouri. A Republican, he is a former member of the Missouri Senate representing the 24th district from 2011 to 2015.

Personal history
John Lamping was born and raised in southern St. Louis County, Missouri. Following graduation from St. Louis University High School, he attended Princeton University, where he earned a degree in Economics in 1985. Lamping worked as a currency trader in New York City and later earned his MBA from NYU. When not involved with his duties in the General Assembly, he works for a St. Louis securities brokerage firm.

He and his wife Caryn (whom he met while in New York City) are the parents of six children.

Political history
In 2010, Lamping defeated Democrat Barbara Fraser in a close general election for a four-year term, to replace the term-limited Joan Bray. The initial vote tally showed a difference of only 133 votes between Lamping, the leader, and Fraser. Fraser requested a recount from the Missouri Secretary of State's office, and on December 22, 2010 the recount officially certified Lamping as the winner by 126 votes.

Lamping did not run for re-election to a second term in the Senate in 2014.

Committee Assignments -- Senator Lamping served on the following committees during the 96th General Assembly: 
 Vice-Chairman, Commerce, Consumer Protection, Energy and the Environment.
 Member, Health, Mental Health, Seniors and Families.
 Member, Jobs, Economic Development and Local Government.
 Member, Transportation.
 Member, Veterans Affairs, Emerging Issues, Pensions & Urban Affairs.

Affordable Care Act bill 
Lamping attracted national attention in 2013 when he introduced a bill which would suspend the state licenses to operate in Missouri of any insurance companies which accepted subsidies offered by the United States government to pay health insurance premiums under the Affordable Care Act. Lamping asserted that (despite National Federation of Independent Business v. Sebelius), the ACA is "illegal" and will eventually be overturned by federal courts.

References

External links
Missouri Senate - John Lamping Archived Missouri Senate website
 

American businesspeople
Republican Party Missouri state senators
Princeton University alumni
New York University Stern School of Business alumni
Politicians from St. Louis County, Missouri
Living people
Year of birth missing (living people)